Arbindanath Rimal is a Nepalese writer and intellectual.

Early life
Arbind Rimal hails from a middle-class Brahmin family in Kathmandu. It is believed that Rimal's grandfather was close to Ranas during Rana dynasty.

Career
Rimal got into contacts with communism during his studies in India. He worked for about five years at the Embassy of the Soviet Union in New Delhi, with the publication of the Nepali-language publication of the embassy Soviet Bhumi. Through his links with the Soviet embassy, he accompanied King Mahendra on his visits to the Soviet Union.

In 1957, Rimal was elected to the Central Committee of the Communist Party of Nepal at the second party congress. He later renounced his communist ideals and broke with the party.

Works
Rimal has written नेपाल थर्काइदिने १९ दिन  ('19 days that shook Nepal'), an account of the events leading up to the 2006 Loktantra Andolan, and  १९९७ देखि २०१७ साल ('From 1997 to 2017').

References

Nepalese male writers
Nepali-language writers
Living people
Communist Party of Nepal (original) politicians
Year of birth missing (living people)